Atractotomus balli is a species of plant bug in the family Miridae.

References

Further reading

 
 

Phylinae
Articles created by Qbugbot
Insects described in 1931